Hirokuni (written: 裕邦 or 博国) is a masculine Japanese given name. Notable people with the name include:

, Japanese boxer
, Japanese sumo wrestler

Japanese masculine given names